The discography of Dimmu Borgir, a Norwegian symphonic black metal band, consists of ten studio albums, four extended plays, one compilation album, six singles and three music videos.

Dimmu Borgir was formed in 1993 by Shagrath, Silenoz, and Tjodalv in Oslo, Norway and released their first extended play, Inn i evighetens mørke (English: Into Eternal Darkness), in 1994 shortly followed by their début studio album, For all tid (English: For All Time), in the same year. Two years later, in 1996, they released their second studio album Stormblåst (English: Stormblown) under Cacophonous and was their final album sung entirely in Norwegian until its re-recording in 2005 under Nuclear Blast. The band's first release under Nuclear Blast was their third studio album Enthrone Darkness Triumphant and was also their first album to make it into the charts; peaking in its seventh week in the Finnish charts at number 26 and debuting in the German charts at number 75. Before the release of their fourth studio album, Spiritual Black Dimensions; in 1999, Dimmu Borgir released the compilation album Godless Savage Garden to, according to the band, "hold fans over while waiting for the next full-length, Spiritual Black Dimensions." Two years later, in 2001, they released their fifth studio album, Puritanical Euphoric Misanthropia, and a further two years later their sixth and first album to chart in the United States; Death Cult Armageddon. In 2005 the band released the rerecording of their second studio album under the title Stormblåst MMV followed by their first concept album In Sorte Diaboli, in 2007, which debuted in at number one in the Norwegian album charts and at number 43 in the Billboard 200, making them the first Norwegian band since a-ha to crack the United States Top 50. As of 2010, Dimmu Borgir had sold over 400,000 albums in the United States.

Albums

Studio albums

Re-recorded albums

Compilation albums

Extended plays

Singles

Videos

Video releases

Music videos

References

External links
Dimmu-borgir official website

Heavy metal group discographies
Discography
Discographies of Norwegian artists